The Classic Crime is an American rock band from Seattle, Washington, formed in 2004. The band's current lineup consists of Matt MacDonald (vocals, guitar), Alan Clark (bass), Robert "Cheeze" Negrin (guitar), and Paul "Skip" Erickson (drums, vocals). They have released three albums and an EP on Tooth & Nail Records, two of which, The Silver Cord (2008) and Vagabonds (2010), charted in the Billboard 200. In July 2011, the band left Tooth & Nail to produce a fourth album with the help of fan donations via Kickstarter, called Phoenix (2012). After the success they found in the crowdfunding approach with Phoenix, the band continued using Kickstarter as a means to fund their albums, subsequently releasing What Was Done: Vol. 1 in 2014, How to Be Human in 2017, and Patterns in the Static in 2020. A seventh full-length album was successfully funded and is due to release sometime in 2022.

Background
Their debut album Albatross was released on May 23, 2006. The band currently has an estimated 10 million plays on Myspace. Albatross had the highest debut sales in the history of Tooth & Nail records with over 4,000 sales in the first week it was released. The band's second full-length record, The Silver Cord  was released July 22, 2008. They also released an EP, Acoustic Seattle Sessions. They finished their third record Vagabonds, which was released April 6, 2010.

The band has toured with A Change Of Pace, A Static Lullaby, Quietdrive, I Am Ghost, Relient K, So They Say, Just Surrender, Powerspace, Mest, Allister, Aiden, and Scary Kids Scaring Kids. They have also toured with fellow Tooth & Nail bands Anberlin, Emery, MxPx, Project 86, the Fold, and Run Kid Run. The band was on both the 2006 and 2008 Warped Tour. The Classic Crime also went on a Headlining ATTICUS tour with A Change of Pace, Lower Definition, Tyler Read, Jet Lag Gemini, and Artist vs Poet. They toured in 2009 with Relient K and Owl City.

They were no longer signed to Tooth & Nail Records as of July 2011. With the assistance of a Kickstarter fundraising project, the band released the album, Phoenix, on August 14, 2012.

On November 8, 2011, Justin that he would be leaving the band following the December 16 concert at the Showbox Sodo in Seattle, WA. He went on to say that he was leaving the band on good terms to pursue a career in health care and to devote more time to being a father.

Matt MacDonald formed a side project with his wife, Kristie, called Vocal Few.  They composed an EP to raise money to provide for their daughter, Praise, who was born December 12, 2011.

In December 2012, the Classic Crime became the second band to go public on The New York Rock Exchange.

Christianity
Some fans have assumed that the Classic Crime is a Christian band due to being signed on to Tooth & Nail Records. Also adding to the confusion is that many music stores and online sales list the Classic Crime as a Christian band for the same reason. This is true of iTunes Store. Also, all four of the Classic Crime's full-length albums have charted on Billboard Music's Top Christian Albums music chart. However, the Classic Crime does not label themselves a "Christian" band. As Matt writes on TCC's discussion board, "We believe faith is personal, and can be only held by an individual person. To entitle a group 'Christian' would be to assume that the group has a collective soul, or at least individual souls tied to a solid collective belief. Not everyone in our band is decidedly set in their faith, and we respect that."

Discography

Studio albums

EPs

Music videos

References

External links
 
 Official Purevolume

Alternative rock groups from Washington (state)
Pop punk groups from Washington (state)
American post-grunge musical groups
American post-hardcore musical groups
Musical groups established in 2004
Tooth & Nail Records artists